Thomas Keith Marinko (3 August 1941 – 12 July 1981) was an Australian rules footballer who played with West Perth, 1960 – 61 in the West Australian Football League and, after waiting two years to be cleared on transfer, St Kilda, 1964 – 65, in the Victorian Football League.

Played in the Victorian Football Association, with Prahran Football Club 1968 – 72, kicking two goals in the 1970 premiership winning team, also that year received the Allan Marshall Memorial Award for Best Clubman. He played one season for Box Hill in 1976.

Notes

External links 

1941 births
1981 deaths
Australian rules footballers from Perth, Western Australia
St Kilda Football Club players
West Perth Football Club players
Prahran Football Club players
Box Hill Football Club players